Tania Popa (born 19 January 1973) is a Romanian actress.

=
 Your Face Sounds Familiar (Season 8, 2015)
 The national selection for the Eurovision Song Contest 2017
 The Farm (Season 3, 2018)

Stage 
 God of Carnage (2010)

References

External links 

Tania Popa on tnb.ro

1973 births
Romanian stage actresses
Romanian film actresses
Caragiale National University of Theatre and Film alumni
Living people